Nils Norman (born 1966) is an artist living in London. He works across the disciplines of public art, architecture and urban planning. His projects challenge notions of the function of public art and the efficacy of mainstream urban planning and large-scale regeneration. Informed by local politics and ideas on alternative economic, ecological systems and play, Norman's work merges utopian alternatives with current urban design to create a humorous critique of the discrete histories and functions of public art and urban planning. Norman was a professor at the Royal Danish Academy of Fine Arts, Copenhagen, Denmark, at the School of Walls and Space from 2009 until 2017.

Life and career

Early life

Norman was born in Sevenoaks, Kent, England in 1966 and lived there until 1979. In 1979 his parents moved to Bexhill, East Sussex. He attended Bexhill High School, Bexhill Sixth Form College and he did his Art Foundation at Hastings College of Arts and Technology. He studied fine Art Painting BA Hons at St. Martins School of Art in London. After graduating in 1989 he moved to Cologne, Germany. There he lived for three years and collaborated with the artists Stephan Dillemuth and Josef Strau at the experimental storefront project Friesenwall 120, during this time Norman also set up a small gallery space in London, which later became Milch. In Cologne Norman worked for one year assisting the German painter Gerhard Richter in his atelier.

Norman founded an experimental space called Poster Studio on Charing Cross Road, London. This space was a collaborative effort with Merlin Carpenter and Dan Mitchell. In 1998 in New York he set up Parasite, together with the artist Andrea Fraser, a collaborative artist led initiative that developed an archive for site-specific projects.

Norman's first US exhibition was at the Pat Hearn Gallery in Chelsea (with Denis Balk and Simon Leung), after which he began to be represented by the late Colin Deland at American Fine Arts.

Public works

Norman exhibits and generates projects and collaborations in museums and galleries internationally.

Norman has completed major public art projects, including a pedestrian bridge, small playgrounds and a landscaping project for the City of Roskilde, Denmark http://urban-matters.org/projectsbyindividuals/the-trekkroner-art-plan-project. He has participated in various biennials worldwide and has developed commissions for SculptureCenter, Long Island City, (http://www.sculpture-center.org/exhibitionsExhibition.htm?id=11909) NY; London Underground, UK (http://art.tfl.gov.uk/project/2439/); Tate Modern, UK ; Loughborough University, UK; Creative Time http://www.dismalgarden.com/sites/default/files/eva_diaz_grey_room_0.pdf, NYC and the Centre d’ Art Contemporain, Geneva, Switzerland.

In 2007, his work was on show at Tate Modern in the Global Cities exhibition, his presentation featured a series of posters displaying ecological and environmental information. In her 2006 survey Beyond Green, Stephanie Smith highlighted Norman's interest in the apparent homogenization of urban spaces resultant from regeneration projects. It has been claimed that "Norman’s work has been compared to the urban projects of artists such as Claes Oldenburg, Robert Smithson, Gordon Matta-Clark, and Krzysztof Wodiczko.". He has been a regular contributor to Mute magazine.
Nils Norman takes inspiration from the work of anarchist theorist Colin Ward, going as far as experimenting with Ward's 1973 book "Streetwork". Norman has also referenced the efforts of Cedric Price, especially those set forth in Price's "Non-Plan".

In 2010 Norman developed two small-scale urban farming parks in the Hague, the Netherlands, that test and question the limitations and potentialities of permaculture as a possible citywide alternative design strategy for urban centres They are an ongoing project and can be visited by the public. He is also the lead artist for the city of Cambridge's project to redevelop part of Trumpington, an area on the city's southern fringe – developing play elements, four pedestrian bridges, bird screens and street furniture. In 2016 Norman was invited as an artist and consultant to develop a play strategy and designs for Mereside in Blackpool this is an ongoing project and he has worked closely with the local community of Mereside to develop ideas for two new play areas. In 2015 he St Fagans National History Museum, Cardiff, Wales commissioned Norman to develop a new playground for the museum that reflects its collection of Welsh historical artefacts, the playground will be completed in Spring 2017.

In collaboration with the artist Gareth Jones Norman has been researching and designing a new public art strategy called City Club for the area around the Milton Keynes Gallery in Milton Keynes. Norman has also been collaborating with the Welsh artist Owen Griffiths on a public realm project in Trebanog, Wales. Working closely with children and parents locally to develop designs for their public spaces, commissioned by Artis Mundi. In 2017 he will complete a new library design for the Rietveld Art Academy Amsterdam. He was a professor at the Royal Danish Academy of Art and Design, Copenhagen, Denmark, where he led the School of Walls and Space until June 2017.

References

English artists
Living people
1966 births
People from Sevenoaks